Hengelo Oost is a railway station in Hengelo, The Netherlands. The station was opened on 1 June 1975 and is on the Almelo–Salzbergen railway.

Train services

Bus services

External links
NS website 
Dutch Public Transport journey planner 

Railway stations in Overijssel
Railway stations in Germany opened in 1975
Hengelo
Railway stations on the Almelo - Salzbergen railway line